Utriculofera variegata is a moth in the subfamily Arctiinae. It was described by Rothschild in 1912. It is found in New Guinea.

References

Moths described in 1912
Lithosiini